Silent Hunter is a World War II submarine combat simulation for MS-DOS, developed by Aeon Electronic Entertainment and published by Strategic Simulations in 1996. The game takes place in the Pacific War during World War II, the player commanding a submarine of the United States Navy. Most contemporary US submarines and Japanese warships are featured along with some generic merchant ships.

Gameplay

A single encounter generator is available, but the standard mode of play is the career mode, where the player must take their boat to patrol far behind enemy lines with the mission to search for and destroy any enemy shipping. For best success, the player should concentrate their search on shipping lanes, which may be deduced from contact reports. There are also special missions which may be assigned to a boat, such as beach reconnaissance  involving photographing potential landing beaches through the periscope, and the rescue of downed airmen. Both missions were performed by the fleet submarines of World War II. The boat is actually commanded by crewing various stations in first person (no crew is visible, even though their voices are heard), which is common in the genre.

In career mode, the game begins when war against Japan is declared and continues through until August 15, 1945, when CINCPAC (Commander in Chief, Pacific Fleet) issues the order to cease all offensive operations against Japan. Success against the enemy rewards the Captain (the player) with medals as appropriate to the degree of success on a given patrol. However, there is a flip side to the game. One patrol without any sinkings will result in a verbal reprimand from COMSUBPAC (Commander, Submarines, Pacific Fleet). Two consecutive patrols with no sinkings will result in the Captain being relieved of command, as happened frequently in the Silent Service, particularly in the early days of the war. If a captain is relieved of command, the game is over. Also, it is possible for Japanese destroyers to sink a submarine by gunfire on the surface, or by depth charge attack while submerged. This also ends the game.

The submarines available in the game are the boats the United States Navy had during the war. They range from the ancient S-boats, and interwar boats like the Tambor class and Sargo class, to the later wartime Gato-class, Balao class, and Tench class subs. Technological advancements become available to the player at the same time in the game that the boats in the fleet got them. These include radar, the plan position indicator radar display, and the bathythermograph.

Weaponry similarly reflects what the boats had at any given point in the war. The torpedoes range from the Mark X used by the S-boats, to the Mark XIV steam torpedo and Mark XVIII electric torpedo, to the anti-escort "Cutie" acoustic homing torpedo. Deck guns, which are of minor value but have their uses, similarly range from three to five inch, again as the boats received them.

Reception 

The game received "favorable" reviews according to video game review aggregator GameRankings. Silent Hunter II developer Shawn Storc stated in an interview that Silent Hunter was a commercial success with 300,000 sold units. By 1999, global sales had reached 350,000 copies. Bruce Geryk of GameSpot considered it a noteworthy hit in the simulation genre, a genre whose "era had passed" in his view.

Silent Hunter was nominated as Computer Games Strategy Pluss 1996 simulation of the year, although it lost to Jane's AH-64D Longbow. The game was a finalist for Computer Gaming Worlds 1996 "Simulation Game of the Year" award, which ultimately went to Jane's AH-64D Longbow.

References

External links

1996 video games
DOS games
DOS-only games
Pacific War video games
Strategic Simulations games
Submarine simulation video games
Naval video games
Ubisoft franchises
Video games developed in the United States
Video games set in Japan
Video games with expansion packs
World War II video games